The Kassel Literary Prize for Grotesque Humor (Kasseler Literaturpreis  für grotesken Humor), established 1985, is an annual prize awarded by the city of Kassel and the Brückner-Kühner foundation in recognition of "grotesque and comic work" at a high artistic level. Prior to 1996, it was also given to literary professors whose work is connected to this theme. The prize includes an award of 10,000 euros.

The foundation has, since 2004, also awarded authors under the age of 35 the Förderpreis Komische Literatur. This prize includes an award of 3,000 euros.

Prior to 2006, the awards were given in November, this was moved to the following February the next year, resulting in the "2006/2007" prizes.

Recipients since 2004

Recipients prior to 2004 

 1985: Loriot
 1986: Eike Christian Hirsch
 1987: Ernst Jandl
 1988: Wolfgang Preisendanz
 1989: Irmtraud Morgner
 1990: Ernst Kretschmer  
 1991: Robert Gernhardt
 1992: Walter Hinck
 1993: Christoph Meckel
 1994: Volker Klotz
 1995: Hanns Dieter Hüsch
 1996: Karl Riha
 1997: Max Goldt
 1998: Franzobel
 1999: Ingomar von Kieseritzky
 2000: Peter Bichsel
 2001: George Tabori
 2002: Franz Hohler
 2003: Eugen Egner

See also
 German literature
 List of literary awards
 List of poetry awards
 List of years in literature
 List of years in poetry

References

External links
Stiftung Brückner-Kühner
Kasseler Literaturpreis für grotesken Humor

Kassel
German literary awards
Awards established in 1985
1985 establishments in West Germany
Annual events in Germany